The Tom Mboya Monument is along Moi Avenue in Nairobi, Kenya. It was erected in 2011 in honour of Tom Mboya, a Kenyan government minister who was assassinated in 1969. The monument stands about twenty meters from where Mboya was murdered.

History 
The monument was designed by sculptor Oshottoe Ondula, costing the Kenyan government KSh.20,000,000/=. The statue was unveiled on October 19, 2011. However, by mid-2019, it, along with another (that of Dedan Kimathi), had fallen into disrepair, and Governor of Machakos Alfred Mutua pledged to clean and repair them. The renovation was completed in April 2021.

References

Monuments and memorials in Kenya
2011 sculptures